Tapan Deb Singha is an Indian politician from West Bengal belonging to All India Trinamool Congress. He is a former member of the West Bengal Legislative Assembly.

Biography
Singha graduated from Kolkata University in 1991. He was elected as a member of the West Bengal Legislative Assembly from Kaliaganj on 28 November 2019. This was the first win for any All India Trinamool Congress candidate from Kaliaganj.

References

Living people
Members of the West Bengal Legislative Assembly
Trinamool Congress politicians from West Bengal
University of Calcutta alumni
People from Uttar Dinajpur district
Year of birth missing (living people)